Thomas Fraser House, also known as Woodham House and Gregg House, is a historic home located at Bishopville, Lee County, South Carolina.  It was built in 1847, and is a two-story, vernacular Greek Revival style house with a gable roof, weatherboard siding and a brick foundation. The front façade features a one-story porch supported by six round brick and stucco columns with prominent bases and Doric order capitals. At the rear of the house is the original kitchen, remodeled about 1900 into a farm office.

It was added to the National Register of Historic Places in 1986.

References 

Houses on the National Register of Historic Places in South Carolina
Greek Revival houses in South Carolina
Houses completed in 1847
Houses in Lee County, South Carolina
National Register of Historic Places in Lee County, South Carolina
1847 establishments in South Carolina